Daina is a 1984 Indian Bodo documentary film directed by Amar Hazarika, starring Ghana Kanta Basumatary as leading actor. Prosenjit Brahma, Arup Gwra Basumatary, Shitala Brahma and Anjali Brahma play in the supporting roles. The film was produced by Bodo Film Society from Kokrajhar district. It was released on 9 September 1984. The music for the film is composed by Dr. Bhupen Hazarika.

Synopsis
The film was based on the witch-craft practice amongst the villagers.

Production
The film was set in the Kokrajhar district and was the first Bodo documentary film produced by Bodo Film Society.

See also
 Bodo films

References

1984 films
1984 documentary films
Indian documentary films